Chen Youliang (陳友諒; 1320 – 3 October 1363) was the founder and first emperor of the dynastic state of Chen Han in Chinese history. He was one of the military leaders and heroes of the people's revolution at the end of the Yuan dynasty.

Biography
Chen was born to a fishing family in Mianyang (沔陽) in present-day Hubei. Some say he was born with surname Chen (陳), while others say he was born with surname Xie (謝).

Vietnamese records say that Chen Youliang was the son of Chen Yiji (陳益稷) or Trần Ích Tắc, a Trần dynasty leader who settled in the Yuan dynasty.

In his childhood, he grew up poor, and he and his family were relatively unsuccessful fishermen. Chen once served as a district official before becoming a general under Ni Wenjun during the Red Turban Rebellion. Ni Wenjun planned to assassinate Xu Shouhui, the Red Turban rebels' leader, but Chen Youliang killed Ni Wenjun before Ni could kill Xu. At this time, Chen Youliang took over Fujian and Jiangxi. Upon hearing that Jiangxi had been captured, Xu Shouhui wished to move the capital there, but Chen Youliang feared that Xu Shouhui would threaten him there and sent an envoy to stop him. Still Xu and his troops arrived in Jiangxi, so he later turned on Xu Shouhui and assassinated him.

In 1357, Chen proclaimed himself "King of Han" in Jiangzhou (江州; present-day Jiujiang, Jiangxi), and emperor the next year after Xu Shouhui died. His era name, as well as his empire's name, was Da Han (大漢; literally "Great Han"). Chen Youliang appointed Zou Pusheng (邹普胜) as Grand Preceptor and Zhang Bixian (张必先) as prime minister (丞相).

From 1359 to 1363 Chen's fleet was the strongest on the upper Yangtze River. His power was at least as great as that of another rebel state, Wu, led by Zhu Yuanzhang, founder of the Ming dynasty.

In 1360 the Han fleet and army began a long war against Wu forces. At that time, the Wu forces were based in Jiqing (present-day Nanjing). The Wu was later renamed "Ming" in 1368. An attack on the Wu capital was defeated thanks to excellent Wu intelligence (likely due to the defection of part of the Han fleet earlier in the year). The war continued until the climactic Battle of Lake Poyang where the Wu fleet narrowly defeated the larger fleet of Han after three days of fighting.

A month after the battle at Lake Poyang, the Han fleet tried to break out from Lake Poyang. During the resulting ship battles Chen was killed (he was alleged to have died from an arrow wound in the head). He was 43 years old at the time of his death in October 3, 1363.

As his crown prince Chen Shan (陳善) had been captured, Chen Youliang was succeeded by his second son, Chen Li, who was soon attacked by the fleet and army of Wu. The conquest of Han took an additional two years but by April 1365 the Han empire was gone and all its lands were now part of the Wu power base.

Family
Grand-ancestors: Chen Qianyi (陈千一)
Father: Chen Pucai (陳普才) became Marquis of Cheng'en (承恩侯) by Zhu Yuanzhang after the downfall of Han
Mother: from the Wu clan (吴氏)
Brothers:
Chen Youfu (陈友富) would be promoted to the title Marquis of Guiren (归仁伯) by Zhu Yuanzhang
Chen Youzhi (陈友直) would be promoted to the title Marquis of Huaien (怀恩伯) by Zhu Yuanzhang
Chen Youren (陳友仁), KIA in the Battle of Poyang Lake
Chen Yougui (陳友貴), KIA in the Battle of Poyang Lake
Spouses: Chen Youliang had several concubines respectively surnamed Yang (杨), Lou (娄), Tao (陶) and Du (阇). Consort Du was captured along with Chen Shan. Concubines Yang and Lou predeceased Chen Youliang.
Children:
Chen Shan (陈善), Crown Prince, joined Ming army
Chen Li, his successor, started Yangsan Jin clan of Korea
Grandchildren
Chen Mingshan (陈明善), a descendant in Korea

Controversial relationship with Trần Ích Tắc
Vietnamese historical annals such as Đại Việt sử ký toàn thư recorded that Chen Youliang sent a diplomatic delegate to Đại Việt to ask for alliance, claiming that he had biological relationship with Trần Dynasty (Trần is the Vietnamese pronunciation of Chen 陳). Chen claimed to be the biological son of Trần Ích Tắc, a Trần royal member who defected to the Yuan forces during the second invasion of Vietnam. However, Chinese history annals did not record any such relationship, instead claimed that Chen Youliang's ancestor originally have the family name as "Xia", later was married into a certain Chen clan and changed his name to the maternal family. Chen Youliang also descended from a fishermen family in Hubei, meanwhile Trần Ích Tắc was appointed as a court magistrate in Huguang, hence it was unlikely that a high-rank magistrate like Ích Tắc had a fishermen son. It is suspected that Chen Youliang pretended to be a Vietnamese royal family to earn support from Đại Việt.

The Trần dynasty, however, did not to respond to Chen's request. Trần Ích Tắc was considered a traitor and was legally removed from the Trần royal family, it is unlikely for Đại Việt to ally with a traitor's descendant. Đại Việt also had no reason to intervene into the affairs of her northern neighbor.

Evaluations 
Through his established empire Chen Han, Chen Youliang is remembered as a revolutionary, even hero, who helped resist Yuan rule and pave the way for the new Ming dynasty.

 Liu Ji: "Friends trust forgiveness and trust, and cross Jing and Xiang, the second half of a few days. Honest, self-controlled, and worry-free. Friends dare to rob the Lord, whose name is incorrect, and whose land is high-class. Their hearts forget themselves every day, so it is advisable to map them first. When Chen is destroyed, Zhang is lonely and can be determined in one fell swoop."
 Zhu Yuanzhang: "Friends will die, and the world is not difficult to decide." "If you trust your friends to be arrogant and sincere, it will cause trouble if you are arrogant, but if you are small, there will be no distant picture."
 Yang Jing: "Those who are like Chen and Zhang, steal from Wu and Chu, build boats to plug rivers, accumulate grain over mountains, and force soldiers to be invincible. However, in the First World War in Poyang, friends trusted be beheaded, and the teacher turned to the east to beg, while Zhang was bound. This is not manpower, but it is also a destiny. " 
 Rao Hanxiang: "Han River First a Hero, Third Chu is magnificent." (“江汉先英、三楚雄风。”)  Quote is essentially saying Chen was a great hero to the Han people.
 "Zhu Yuanzhang's Year to Record": "To the country of 600,000 to try the river flow, Mu Ye, Kunyang, Chibi, Lishui, and ancient emperors can use their heroes, but they have not heard of it."
 Cai Dongfan: "I said that friends have a way to lose themselves. Jiangzhou has lost, and the fundamental place has gone. It is appropriate to gather troops and save their strength. Xu Tu can't wait to raise another one. He can't wait, put all your eggs in one basket, lose his children, lose his love, or even die, and laugh for the world. It is obvious that the rise and fall of the country is really related to people's plans, not like Xiang Yu's first Wujiang River."
 Historian Wu Han: "Although Chen Youliang failed, he was, after all, a hero who opposed the rule of the Mongolian and Han landlord classes in the Yuan dynasty. He played a role in history. At that time, people sympathized with him and missed him. His grave is still preserved under the newly built Yangzi River Bridge for visitors to mourn."

Memorial 
Also see Tomb of Chen Youliang (陈友谅墓), a cenotaph (衣冠冢).

Tomb 
On October 3, 1363, after Chen Youliang died in the Battle of Poyang Lake, his real remains disappeared. His clothes were taken back by his subordinates in a boat and sent to the south slope of Sheshan, approaching the Wuchang Bridge Head (武昌桥头) of Yangtze River Bridge in Wuhan City, Hubei Province (next to the Yellow Crane Tower, a famous scenic spot in Wuhan, Hubei Province) for burial.

It faces south, has a rectangle with rounded corners and a height of 2.2 meters. The tomb base is 12 meters long. The tomb is built on the mountain. Here is There is a hexagonal unknown pavilion nearby, and the pillars of the pavilion are engraved with handwriting.

In the Qing Dynasty, this place became a part of the garden "Naiyuan" (乃园) of Hubei Provincial Bureau of Supervision, and few people visited it. In 1908, Wan Yaohuang and Geng Zhongzhao discovered this tomb in the thirty-fourth year of Guangxu in Qing Dynasty.

In 1912, Hubei Provincial Department of Internal Affairs requested renovation, and built a 16-step tomb road and a tall archway in front of the tomb (between the archway and the tomb). On the forehead of the memorial archway, "Jiang Han Xian Ying" ("江汉先英”), and on the back, "Three Chu Xiongfeng" (“三楚雄风"), a monument was erected in front of the tomb, "Da Han Chen Youliang Tomb", and Rao Hanxiang of Guangji made an inscription. There is also a tablet pavilion on each side of the tomb. In 1913, the cemetery was renovated and surrounded by pines and cypresses.

In 1923 (after the Revolution of 1911), the Republic of China rebuilt it.

In 1949, after the founding of the People's Republic of China, it was slightly repaired.

In 1956, the tomb was listed as a cultural relic protection unit in Hubei Province.

It was destroyed during the Cultural Revolution. In 1981, the local government of the Communist Party of China allocated funds to restore it. In June, 1998, it was completely renovated, with brick cement tomb walls and the monument of "Rebuilding Dahan Chen Youliang Tomb".

Memorial Palace 
At 9:00 on December 18, 2013, the local government opened the "Chen Youliang Memorial Hall" (陈友谅纪念馆) at 90 Pier, Mian Street, Xiantao City, Hubei Province (formerly Mianyang, Hubei Province). This memorial hall has three floors of antique buildings, covering an area of 3,891 square meters, with a total construction area of 1,615 square meters. The first two floors have an exhibition hall of 920 square meters, and the last floor is an office rest area.

Legends 
Yuan Mei's "Zi Bu Yu" (袁枚《子不語》), Volume 10, contains an article "Destroying Chen Youliang Temple", which tells the story of the ruined Jingzhou Chen Youliang Temple when Zhao Xili (赵锡礼) was appointed as a county magistrate. Zhao only knew that it was an unknown Wangye Temple, and thought it was an obscene temple and destroyed the temple, but he didn't know that the temple was dedicated to Chen Youliang, and he didn't know it until he asked Zhang Tianshi (张天师).

Cultural portrayals

Film and TV 

 1978 Heavenly Sword and Dragon Slaying Sabre《倚天屠龙记》 by Long Tiansheng (龙天生)
 1984 《倚天屠龙记》 by Chen Xiang (陈祥)
 1986 《倚天屠龙记》 何贵林
 1987 《大明群英》 刘青云  Liu Qingyun
 1993 《朱元璋》 张矩 Zhang Ju
 1994 《倚天屠龙记》 郑平君
 1998 《乞丐皇帝传奇》 李志希
 2001 《倚天屠龙记》 陈荣峻 Chen Rongjun
 2003 《倚天屠龙记》 孙斌
 2004 《武当》 刘旭 Liu Xu
 2006 《传奇皇帝朱元璋》李庆祥
 2006 《朱元璋》李明
 2008 《飞天舞》 沉浮
 2009 《倚天屠龙记》 周晓滨
 2009 《真命天子》 季肖冰
 2015 《乞丐皇帝与大脚皇后传奇》 季晨
 2019 《倚天屠龍記》侯瑞祥

Novels 
Chen Youliang features as a character in the wuxia novel The Heaven Sword and Dragon Saber by Louis Cha.

See also 

 Chen Han
 Chen Li (emperor)

Citations

References
Dreyer, Edward. (1982). Early Ming China: A Political History. Stanford: Stanford University Press. .
The Cambridge History of China Volume 7, pp. 65–89 (this section was written by Dreyer)
 

Red Turban rebels
Chinese emperors
Yuan dynasty people
1320 births
1363 deaths
Burials in Wuhan
Deified Chinese people
Founding monarchs